Dicheniotes sexfissata is a species of tephritid or fruit flies in the genus Dicheniotes of the family Tephritidae.

Distribution
Kenya.

References

Tephritinae
Insects described in 1909
Taxa named by Theodor Becker
Diptera of Africa